Sun Yulong (born 1 September 1988) is a Chinese wheelchair curler, 2022 Paralympics champion, .

Teams

References

External links

Living people
1988 births
Chinese male curlers
Chinese wheelchair curlers
World wheelchair curling champions
Place of birth missing (living people)
Wheelchair curlers at the 2022 Winter Paralympics
Medalists at the 2022 Winter Paralympics
Paralympic medalists in wheelchair curling
Paralympic gold medalists for China
21st-century Chinese people